The Rugby League Conference Welsh Championship was the lower of two Welsh domestic leagues for the sport of rugby league. It was a division of the Rugby League Conference competition which covers all of Great Britain.

History

The Rugby League Conference was founded in 1997 as the Southern Conference, a 10-team pilot league for teams in the South of England and English Midlands. It expanded into Wales for the first time in 2001 when Cardiff Demons joined the South West division.

After two years of just one club in South Wales, the RFL saw that it was time to expand, letting in six more open-aged sides to form the new Welsh Conference and Wales gained its own division for the first time.

The Premier Division were set up in 2005 for teams who had achieved a certain playing standard and were able to travel further afield to find stronger opposition. The new Premier Divisions included the North Premier, the South Premier, the Central Premier and the Welsh Premier.

The Welsh Premier division was split into two divisions East Wales and West Wales in 2006, though this decision was reversed for the following season.

The Welsh Conference Junior League began in 2009.

Due to the growth of the sport in Wales, in 2010 a separate Championship division was formed which would function at one tier lower than the present Premier division. This Championship division featured teams from South Wales, but another Championship division featuring teams from North Wales was meant to be contested, but it didn't materialise and a rugby league nines tournament was played instead.

The South Wales Rugby League Championship was given a re-structure following four West Wales clubs not fulfilling fixtures. Amman Valley Rhinos, Dinefwr Sharks, Swansea/Llanelli Dragons and West Wales Wild Boars were omitted and replaced with newly formed Dyffryn Devils. The league was scrapped after the 2011 season.

2011

Teams

Teams play each other on a home-and-away basis.

NB: Blackwood Bulldogs failed to start the season

Winners

 2010 Neath Port Talbot Steelers
 2011 Bonymaen Broncos

Junior league
Welsh teams also compete at under-17; under-15 and under-13 age groups.

External links
 Official Wales Rugby League Website

Rugby league in Wales
Rugby League Conference
Rugby league competitions in the United Kingdom